Love Shines is the twenty-ninth studio album and seventh gospel album by American singer B. J. Thomas, released in 1983.

Track listing
 "Love Shines" (Kent Robbins) - 3:04
 "He's Got Religion" (Jerry Gillespie) - 3:27
 "Best Friend" (Dan Hoffman, Larry Keith) - 3:26
 "Born to Fly" (Aaron Wilburn) - 3:37
 "They See God There" (Dan Keen, Jim Weber) - 2:57
 "He's Coming Back in a Blaze of Glory" (Johnny Slate, Danny Morrison, Larry Keith) - 2:53
 "Teach Me to See" (Gloria Thomas, Aaron Wilburn) - 3:32
 "Pray for Me" (B.J. Thomas, Gloria Thomas, Aaron Wilburn) - 3:18
 "That's What's Wrong with the World Today" (Larry Kingston, "Lathan", Gloria Thomas) - 3:11
 "Let's All Go Down to the River" (Sue Richards, Earl Montgomery) - 2:39

Personnel
 Producer, steel guitar – Pete Drake
 Horn & string arrangements – Bergen White
 Engineers – Al Pachucki, Randy Best
 Drums - Gene Chrisman
 Bass - Mike Leech
 Electric guitar - Dale Sellers
 Piano - David Briggs
 Harmonica - Charlie McCoy
 Percussion - Farrell Morris
 Horns - Roger Bissell, James "Buddy" Skipper, George Tidwell, William Puett, Denis Solee
 Strings - Carl Gorodetzky, George Binkley, Dennis Molchan, Walter Schwede, Pamela Vanosdale, Phyllis Hiltz, Stephanie Woolf, Marvin Chantry, Gary Vanosdale, Roy Christensen, John David Boyle
 Background vocals - The Jordanaires
 Art direction & design – Bill Brunt
 Illustration - Bill Myers
 Photography – Jim McQuire

References

1983 albums
B. J. Thomas albums